Clive Norbert Loveland (born 19 November 1934), is a male former athlete who competed for England.

Athletics career
He represented England in the javelin at the 1958 British Empire and Commonwealth Games in Cardiff, Wales.

References

1934 births
English male javelin throwers
Athletes (track and field) at the 1958 British Empire and Commonwealth Games
Living people
Commonwealth Games competitors for England